Ilya Belyakov (born 26 August 1982) is a Korean of Russian origin who lives and performs in South Korea as a television personality, medical interpreter, professional linguist and language teacher.

Personal

Early life

He was born in Vladivostok, a port city of the Russian Far East, an approximate two-hour flight from Seoul, where he majored in Korean language at Far Eastern Federal University.

Education and work in South Korea
He arrived in South Korea for the first time in 2003, and received the highest score, for a Russian, on the language proficiency test TOPIK. He completed a master's degree at the Korean Language Institute of Yonsei University as a scholarship student supported by the Korea Foundation, and in 2015 was studying for a Ph.D in anthropology and linguistics at the University of South Carolina. He is fluent in Japanese, English , French and Spanish, as well as Korean.

He started working at Samsung's global human resources department in 2010.

He is a contributing columnist for Korea.net, sharing anecdotal and cultural perspectives as a Russian living in Seoul.

Broadcast and acting career
On 17 November 2014 he was a "visiting intern" guest on the JTBC talk-variety show Non-Summit, that was made of a cast of young men from different countries, living in Seoul, who debated and discussed issues, in Korean, with perspectives they brought from their various cultures, from their native countries. He was selected to become a permanent cast member on 12 January 2015 for Episode 28. As part of the cast, along with more serious discussions, he shared his old-fashioned dress style of bell-bottoms, entertained with a song duet with Baek Jiyoung, and told stories of growing up in Russia. When Non-Summit changed six members of the cast on 29 June 2015, after Episode 52, in order to add new cast from different countries, he was recognized, by his fans and the show's audience, as a special contributing member to the show's reception.

Celebrity and endorsements
In April 2015, he and Non-Summit cast member Tyler Rasch, both Honorary Culture Sharing Ambassadors of the Korea Foundation, attended a ceremony for the new "Koreans and Foreigners Together" program.

Filmography

Television series

References

External links

1982 births
Living people
Russian television personalities
Russian expatriates in South Korea
Mass media people from Vladivostok
Far Eastern Federal University alumni
Naturalized citizens of South Korea
South Korean people of Russian descent